Bitstream Inc. was a type foundry that produced digital typefaces. It was founded in 1981 by Matthew Carter and Mike Parker among others. It was located in Marlborough, Massachusetts. The font business, including MyFonts, was acquired by Monotype Imaging in March 2012. The remainder of the business, responsible for Pageflex and Bolt Browser, was spun off to a new entity named Marlborough Software Development Holdings Inc. It was later renamed Pageflex, Inc following a successful management buyout in December 2013.

Products

Bitstream created a library of "classic" fonts (usually under different names for trademark reasons) in digital form (for example, Times Ten as 'Dutch 801'). The Bitstream font collection is most widely used through its inclusion with the CorelDRAW software.  The company received extensive criticism for its strategy of cheaply offering digitisations of pre-existing typefaces that it had not designed. While technically not illegal, font designer John Hudson would describe its selling of large numbers of typefaces on CD at discount prices as "one of the worst instances of piracy in the history of type".

Bitstream developed a number of fonts on its own, such as Charter, by Matthew Carter, Iowan Old Style by John Downer and the freeware Bitstream Vera family of fonts.

One of their best known fonts is Swiss 721 BT, which is a Helvetica clone with condensed versions and a rounded version. It was among the first digitally available Swiss family typefaces, being designed for that purpose in 1982.

Another Bitstream product is Font Fusion, a font rasterizing engine developed jointly with Type Solutions, Inc., which was later owned entirely by Bitstream.

The multi-byte character set was named Bitstream International Character Set (BICS).

History 
The company had a high level of involvement in BeOS, with older BeOS releases using a Bitstream renderer, and the latest development releases from 2001 using Font Fusion. The OS, including its freeware releases, included a large number of Bitstream fonts, including their clones of Times New Roman, Helvetica and Courier.

On December 2, 1998, Bitstream Inc. announced acquisition of all outstanding stock of Type Solutions, Inc. In addition, Sampo Kaasila, its founder and president and the creator of TrueType, agreed to join Bitstream's team as Director of Research and Development.

In March 2000, Bitstream launched MyFonts, an open marketplace offering fonts from various foundries.

In January 2009, Bitstream introduced the BOLT Browser, a Java ME-based Web browser for mobile phones. It was distributed free of charge to consumers and was built using the company's ThunderHawk mobile Web browsing technology for mobile network operators and handset manufacturers. The product was discontinued by the end of 2011.

See also
 Bitstream Vera
 Bitstream Charter
 Bitstream Cyberbit
 MyFonts
 ThunderHawk
 Bolt (web browser)
 Corel
 TrueDoc
 Mike Parker (typographer)

References 

Commercial type foundries
Software companies based in Massachusetts
Companies based in Cambridge, Massachusetts
Design companies established in 1981
Software companies established in 1981
1981 establishments in Massachusetts
Software companies disestablished in 2012
Companies formerly listed on the Nasdaq
2012 mergers and acquisitions
Defunct software companies of the United States